Samuel Kane (né McGlashan; born 30 November 1968) is an English actor, singer, and talent agent.

Early life
Kane was born Kenneth McGlashan on 30 November 1968 in Huyton, Merseyside.

Career
Kane has appeared in soap operas such as Brookside, Coronation Street, and Emmerdale.

Personal life
Kane married page 3 model Linda Lusardi on 9 August 1998. They have two children.

Filmography
As actor
Emmerdale (2008)
Coronation Street (2001)
Brookside (1995–1999)
Vendetta  (2013)
The Royal (2007)

As himself
Loose Women (2008)
Dancing on Ice (2006)
Top Variety Night (2005)
An Audience with Joe Pasquale (2005)
Loose Lips (2003)
Another Audience with Ken Dodd (2002) (TV)
Fort Boyard (1999)
Night Fever (1999)
Blankety Blank (1999)
An Audience with the Bee Gees (1998)
Gladiators (1997)
Pointless (with Linda Lusardi) (2013)

References

External links
 
 

1968 births
Living people
Male actors from Liverpool
People from Huyton
English male soap opera actors